Marko Pajač (born 11 May 1993) is a Croatian professional footballer who plays as a left back for  club Genoa.

Club career
Pajač came up through the Varteks youth academy, starting in 2006. The organization lost its major sponsor, the Varteks clothes factory, and changed its name to NK Varaždin in June 2010, just a month before Pajač signed a scholarship contract with them. He made his debut for the first team against Lusitanos on 30 June 2011 in the first qualifying round of the 2011–12 UEFA Europa League as a second-half substitute. Varaždin won the match 5–1, with Pajač sent-off in the stoppage time for a professional foul. The following month, Pajač signed a professional contract with Varaždin. After the financially struggling Varaždin was expelled from the 2011–12 Prva HNL, Pajač signed a five-year contract with Lokomotiva in June 2012.

On 29 August 2014, Pajač signed a three-year contract with the Hungarian club Videoton.

On 31 January 2019, Pajac joined Empoli on loan with an option to buy until 30 June 2019.

On 20 August 2019, Pajač joined Genoa on loan with an option to buy.

On 1 February 2021, Pajač completed a move to Brescia.

On 11 July 2022, Pajač returned to Genoa.

Career statistics

References

External links

1993 births
Living people
Footballers from Zagreb
Association football midfielders
Croatian footballers
Croatia youth international footballers
Croatia under-21 international footballers
NK Varaždin players
NK Lokomotiva Zagreb players
NK Sesvete players
Fehérvár FC players
NK Celje players
Cagliari Calcio players
Benevento Calcio players
A.C. Perugia Calcio players
Empoli F.C. players
Genoa C.F.C. players
Brescia Calcio players
Croatian Football League players
Nemzeti Bajnokság I players
Slovenian PrvaLiga players
Serie A players
Serie B players
Croatian expatriate footballers
Expatriate footballers in Hungary
Croatian expatriate sportspeople in Hungary
Expatriate footballers in Slovenia
Croatian expatriate sportspeople in Slovenia
Expatriate footballers in Italy
Croatian expatriate sportspeople in Italy